Anna Louise Paulson is an American economist who is Executive Vice President and Director of Research of the Federal Reserve Bank of Chicago. She is a member of the American Economic Association’s Committee on the Status of Women in the Economics Profession and a past board member of the Western Economic Association International.

Her research focuses on how households and firms cope with risk and incomplete financial markets, and how their financial decision-making is influenced by economic events.

Selected works 

 Paulson, Anna L., and Robert Townsend. "Entrepreneurship and financial constraints in Thailand." Journal of Corporate Finance 10, no. 2 (2004): 229–262.
 Cole, Shawn, Anna Paulson, and Gauri Kartini Shastry. "Smart money? The effect of education on financial outcomes." The Review of Financial Studies 27, no. 7 (2014): 2022–2051.
 Paulson, Anna L., Robert M. Townsend, and Alexander Karaivanov. "Distinguishing limited liability from moral hazard in a model of entrepreneurship." Journal of political Economy 114, no. 1 (2006): 100–144.
 Cole, Shawn, Anna Paulson, and Gauri Kartini Shastry. "High school curriculum and financial outcomes: The impact of mandated personal finance and mathematics courses." Journal of Human Resources 51, no. 3 (2016): 656–698.
 Osili, Una Okonkwo, and Anna L. Paulson. "Institutions and financial development: Evidence from international migrants in the United States." The Review of Economics and Statistics 90, no. 3 (2008): 498–517.

References 

21st-century American economists
American women economists
Living people
University of Chicago alumni
Carleton College alumni
Financial economists
Year of birth missing (living people)
21st-century American women